Navtilos (Greek: Ναυτίλος) may refer to:

Navtilos, a volcanic dome on the island Nea Kameni, Santorini
Navtilos (Antikythera), an islet north of the coast of Antikythera